Benthastelena is a genus of sea snails, marine gastropod mollusks, in the family Calliostomatidae.

Species
Species within the genus Benthastelena include:
 Benthastelena cristata (B. A. Marshall, 1995)
 Benthastelena diademata (B. A. Marshall, 1995)
 Benthastelena kanakorum (B. A. Marshall, 2001)
 Benthastelena katherina Iredale, 1936
 † Benthastelena muta (Finlay, 1924)
 † Benthastelena susanae Maxwell, 1992
 † Benthastelena transenna (Suter, 1917)

The following species were brought into synonymy:
 Benthastelena coronata (B. A. Marshall, 1995): synonym of Benthastelena kanakorum (B. A. Marshall, 2001)

References

 Marshall, B. A. (2016). New species of Venustatrochus Powell, 1951 from New Zealand, and new species of Falsimargarita Powell, 1951 and a new genus of the Calliostomatidae from the southwest Pacific, with comments on some other calliostomatid genera (Mollusca: Gastropoda). Molluscan Research. 36: 119–141.

External links
 Iredale, T. (1936). Australian molluscan notes, no. 2. Records of the Australian Museum. 19(5): 267-340, pls 20-24

Calliostomatidae
Gastropod genera